Joan Brady may refer to:

Joan Brady (American-British writer) (born 1939), winner of the Whitbread Book of the Year
Joan Brady (Christian novelist) (born 1950), American writer of Christian novels